The Life of (Flavius) Josephus ( Iosepou bios), also called the "Life of Flavius Josephus", or simply Vita, is an autobiographical text written by Josephus in approximately 94-99 CE – possibly as an appendix to his Antiquities of the Jews (cf. Life 430) – where the author for the most part re-visits the events of the War, apparently in response to allegations made against him by Justus of Tiberias (cf. Life 336).

Editions
William Whiston, The whole genuine works of Flavius Josephus, Vol. 3, Blackie, 1859, p. 192f.

External links

 
The Life of Josephus. Greek and two English editions. A site by Steve Mason.
Loeb Classical Library Josephus Volume 1 Life and Against Apion

Works by Josephus
1st-century history books
Autobiographies